Goatman is a genus of crabs in the family Xanthidae, containing the following species:
Paramedaeus globosus Serène & Vadon, 1981
Paramedaeus megagomphios Davie, 1997
Paramedaeus octogesimus Ng & Clark, 2002
Paramedaeus planifrons (Sakai, 1965)
Paramedaeus simplex (A. Milne-Edwards, 1873)

References

Xanthoidea